Consolidated Railway or Consolidated Railroad may refer to:
Consolidated Railway (Connecticut), street railway subsidiary of the New York, New Haven and Hartford Railroad
Consolidated Railroad of Vermont, predecessor of the Central Vermont Railway
Consolidated Rail Corporation, created by the U.S. government in 1976 to take over bankrupt railroads in the northeast U.S.